The 2022–23 Irish Super League season is the 49th running of Basketball Ireland's premier men's basketball competition. The season features 14 teams from across the Republic of Ireland and Northern Ireland.

Teams

Results

Regular season standings

North Conference

South Conference

Playoffs

Bracket

Quarter-finals

Source: Basketball Ireland

Relegation play-off

Semi-finals

Final

National Cup

Round 1

Quarter-finals

Semi-finals

Final

Source: Basketball Ireland

Awards

Player of the Month

Coach of the Month

Statistics leaders

Regular season
 Player of the Year: TBD
 Young Player of the Year: TBD
 Coach of the Year: TBD
 All-Star First Team:
 TBD
 TBD
 TBD
 TBD
 TBD
 All-Star Second Team:
 TBD
 TBD
 TBD
 TBD
 TBD
 All-Star Third Team:
 TBD
 TBD
 TBD
 TBD
 TBD

References

External links
Season fixtures
Season preview
Opening weekend
National Cup bracket
National Cup quarter-final preview
National Cup quarter-final recap
National Cup semi-final preview
National Cup semi-final recap
National Cup final preview
National Cup final recap
Playoffs quarter-finals preview

Irish
Super League (Ireland) seasons
Basket
Basket